Agnete Synnøve Carlsen (born 15 January 1971) is a former Norwegian professional footballer who played as a midfielder. With the Norway women's national team, Carlsen won the 1995 FIFA Women's World Cup and an Olympic bronze medal in 1996. At club level Carlsen played for SK Sprint-Jeløy in Norway, then joined Japanese L. League team Nikko Securities Dream Ladies on a professional contract.

International career
Carlsen made her debut for the senior Norway women's national football team in June 1988, starting a 2–1 defeat by Brazil at the 1988 FIFA Women's Invitation Tournament in China. She scored her first goal in her second appearance, a 3–0 win over the Netherlands in Rijsoord.

In July 1989 Carlsen played in Norway's 4–1 defeat by West Germany in the 1989 European Competition for Women's Football final. The match was played before 22,000 fans in Osnabrück. Two years later, the competition had been rebranded as the UEFA Women's Championship and Carlsen's Norway again lost to the Germans in the final, 3–1 this time. Norway also reached the final of the inaugural 1991 FIFA Women's World Cup, held in China in November 1991. They lost 2–1 to the United States after Michelle Akers' late winning goal in front of 63,000 at Tianhe Stadium in Guangzhou.

Carlsen got her first winner's medal with the national team when Norway beat hosts Italy 1–0 in the 1993 UEFA Women's Championship final. She was also part of the squad which won the 1995 FIFA Women's World Cup in Sweden, but was restricted to two substitute appearances during the tournament.

At the inaugural Olympic women's football tournament at the 1996 Atlanta Olympics, Carlsen was sent-off in Norway's semi-final defeat by the United States. She was suspended for the subsequent bronze medal match in which Norway defeated Brazil 2–0. Carlsen played in Norway's 1997 UEFA Women's Championship campaign, then retired from international football to concentrate on her professional club career in Japan. She won 97 caps and scored 17 goals.

International

References

External links
 
 
 

1971 births
Living people
Norwegian women's footballers
Footballers at the 1996 Summer Olympics
Olympic footballers of Norway
Olympic bronze medalists for Norway
Olympic medalists in football
Norway women's international footballers
1991 FIFA Women's World Cup players
1995 FIFA Women's World Cup players
FIFA Women's World Cup-winning players
Norwegian expatriate women's footballers
Norwegian expatriate sportspeople in Japan
Toppserien players
SK Sprint-Jeløy (women) players
Kolbotn Fotball players
Athene Moss players
People from Moss, Norway
Expatriate women's footballers in Japan
Nadeshiko League players
Nikko Securities Dream Ladies players
Medalists at the 1996 Summer Olympics
UEFA Women's Championship-winning players
Women's association football midfielders
Nadeshiko League MVPs
Sportspeople from Viken (county)